Eddie Mae Steward (1938–2000) was known for her activism during the Civil Rights Movement in the state of Florida.

Ms. Steward served as president of both the Jacksonville NAACP as well as the Florida State Conference.

In 1971, Ms. Steward allowed her children Jerry, Ervin, Angela, Alta, Carla and Venetia to be used as the plaintiffs in a lawsuit against the Duval County School Board. The lawsuit Mims v. Duval County School System made her a household name throughout the city due to forced busing that occur as a result.

Ms. Steward served as president of the Jacksonville NAACP from 1972-1978. During her three terms, she fought against racial discrimination in the police, fire department and city government. She organized numerous demonstration and boycotts against racial profiling of blacks by police. Under her leadership, the membership was increased to over 2,500 members, which made it the largest NAACP branch in the Southeastern region.

After not seeking reelection to the NAACP post, she served as a member of the Florida State Housing Council and Florida State Biracial monitoring Committee.

Ms. Steward ran unsuccessfully for the Jacksonville City Council twice and Florida State Senate.

Ms. Steward died in 2000 and is interred at Edgewood Cemetery in Jacksonville. A post office has been named in her honor.

External links
Naming of the Eddie Mae Steward Post Office
Judge rules Jax schools desegregated

1938 births
2000 deaths
Steward, Eddie Mae
African-American people in Florida politics
People from Jacksonville, Florida
20th-century African-American people